Ema Adivitaloga (born 27 July 1994) is a Fijian rugby union player.

Rugby career

Super W 
Adivitaloga was selected for the Fijiana Drua squad in their debut 2022 Super W season. She started in their debut match against the Rebels. She also featured against the Reds in the second round of the competition. She played against the Waratahs in round five and in the Grand Final.

International 
Adivitaloga was named in the Fijiana squad for two test matches against Australia and Japan in May 2022. She was in the starting lineup in both tests against Japan and Australia. In September she played in a warm up match against Canada. She was also named in the Fijiana squad for the 2021 Rugby World Cup.

References 

1994 births
Living people
Female rugby union players
Fijian female rugby union players
Fiji women's international rugby union players
Fiji international women's rugby sevens players